Barnes Hits Anthology (also known as The Best Of... Anthology or simply Hits) is the first greatest hits album by Australian rock musician, Jimmy Barnes. It debuted at number 1 in Australia and number 3 in New Zealand.

It was nominated for Highest Selling Album at the ARIA Music Awards of 1997, but lost to Recurring Dream by Crowded House.

The album was released on vinyl for the first time in November 2018.

Track listing

Double disc edition
"Different Lives"
"No Second Prize" (1996 version)
"Edgewood"
"Love Will Find a Way" (Rough Mix)
"No Frills"
"Tear My Heart Out"
"Going to Mexico"
"Bad News"
"The Other Side"
"Destiny"
"Seven Days" (12" Mix)
"Sydney Ladies"
"Black and Blue"
"Gonna See My Baby Tonight" (with Nathan Cavaleri)
"I Gotcha" (Tex Mex Remix)
"Every Beat" (Dark Reggae 12" Mix)
"White Room"

Charts
Hits was Barnes' seventh number 1 album in Australia.

Weekly charts

Year-end charts

Certifications

See also
 List of number-one albums in Australia during the 1990s

References

Mushroom Records compilation albums
1996 greatest hits albums
Jimmy Barnes albums
Compilation albums by Australian artists